Dancing with the Stars is an American dance competition television series that premiered on June 1, 2005, on ABC. It is the U.S. version of the UK series Strictly Come Dancing, and one of several iterations of the Dancing with the Stars franchise. The show pairs celebrities with professional dancers. Each couple performs predetermined dances and competes against the others for judges' points and audience votes. The couple receiving the lowest combined total of judges' points and audience votes is eliminated each week until only the champion dance pair remains.

The show was hosted by Tom Bergeron from its inception until 2019. Lisa Canning was co-host in the first season, Samantha Harris co-hosted seasons two through nine, Brooke Burke-Charvet in seasons ten through seventeen, and Erin Andrews from season eighteen through twenty-eight. From seasons 29 through 31, Tyra Banks served as host of the show. Starting with season 31, Alfonso Ribeiro joined as co-host.

The 30th season of the show aired September–November 2021. On April 8, 2022, it was announced that, beginning with the 31st season, Dancing with the Stars would move from ABC to Disney+.

Cast

Hosts

Tom Bergeron (who was also hosting America's Funniest Home Videos, also on ABC, at the time of the show's debut) was the host for the show's first 28 seasons, beginning with its premiere in 2005. In season 1, his co-host was Lisa Canning. She was replaced by Samantha Harris for seasons 2 through 9 (2006–2009), who was then replaced by Brooke Burke-Charvet from seasons 10 through 17 (2010–2013). Erin Andrews took over as co-host starting in season 18 (2014). Drew Lachey served as a temporary replacement for Harris during season 5 (2007) during her absence for 3 weeks due to maternity leave. Leah Remini filled in for Andrews in week 6 of season 19, due to commitments with the 2014 World Series and filled in for her again in weeks 6 and 7 of season 21 for the 2015 World Series. Season 19 champion Alfonso Ribeiro filled in for Bergeron on week 4 of season 21, when Bergeron was absent to be with his ailing father.

On July 13, 2020, Bergeron announced in a tweet that he had been let go from the series. ABC and BBC Studios made an official announcement shortly afterwards saying Andrews would also be exiting the program. The following day, model and host Tyra Banks was announced to be joining the show as host in addition to serving as an executive producer for the twenty-ninth season. On July 14, 2022, it was announced that Ribeiro would join Banks as co-host for the thirty-first season. On March 17, 2023, it was revealed that Banks would be leaving the show, prior to season 32.

Judging panel
The regular judges are Len Goodman, who serves as head judge, Carrie Ann Inaba, and Bruno Tonioli. Goodman was absent for much of season 19, all of season 21, much of season 23 and all of season 29. Julianne Hough, who was a professional dancing partner for seasons 4–8, was added as a full-time judge on the panel for three seasons, 19–21, after having been a guest judge in the previous two seasons. She did not return for season 22. Hough did return as a full-time judge for seasons 23 and 24 but did not return subsequently. Julianne's brother, Derek Hough, replaced regular head judge Len Goodman for season 29, as Goodman was unable to be in Los Angeles due to COVID-19 travel restrictions, though he was able to "share his ballroom expertise" from England during the season via pre-taped clips. Several former contestants appeared as judges in episode 200 (in season 11), including Hélio Castroneves, Mel B, Drew Lachey, Gilles Marini, Kelly Osbourne, and Emmitt Smith. Other celebrities, most often those who are associated with the world of dancing, former professional dancers, and past contestants have appeared as the fourth judge or in absence of one of the main judges, including Paula Abdul, Donnie Burns, Nick Carter, Cher, Maksim Chmerkovskiy, Michael Flatley, Kevin Hart, Jessie J, Rashad Jennings, Baz Luhrmann, Ricky Martin, Idina Menzel, Abby Lee Miller, Mandy Moore, Olivia Newton-John, Kenny Ortega, Donny Osmond, Pitbull, Redfoo, Alfonso Ribeiro, Robin Roberts, David Ross, Shania Twain, Leah Remini and Zendaya.

The seventh episode of Season 31 marked the first time five judges were ever featured on the panel at once, when Michael Bublé appeared as both a performer and bonus judge for a themed night featuring his music. Goodman announced during the Season 31 Semifinals that he would be retiring from the show at the end of the season.

Musicians
For 17 seasons, the Harold Wheeler orchestra and singers provided the live music for the show. On February 7, 2014, it was announced that Ray Chew would be brought in as band leader, bringing with him a new band of instrumentalists and singers.

Cast timeline
Color key

Couples

A total of 367 celebrities have appeared in the 31 seasons of the series. For each season, the celebrities are paired with a professional partner who instructs them in the various dances each week and competes alongside them in the televised competition. A total of 49 professional partners have appeared alongside celebrities, some for only one season (mostly in the earliest seasons). The professional who has competed on the most seasons is Cheryl Burke, with 25 seasons.

Key:

 Won the season
 Placed second in the season
 Placed third in the season
 Placed fourth (in the final) of the season
 Placed last in the season
 Withdrew in the season
 Participating in current season

Notes:
 Only 3 professionals have won in their first season with a celebrity partner. These are Alec Mazo (season 1), Cheryl Burke (season 2) and Julianne Hough (season 4).
 Mark Ballas was the first to win in their last season with a celebrity partner following his win with Charli D'Amelio.
 Only 3 professionals have won twice in a row. These are Cheryl Burke (seasons 2 and 3), Julianne Hough (seasons 4 and 5) and Derek Hough (seasons 10 and 11, and again with seasons 16 and 17).
 Derek Hough has the most wins of any professional dancer, with 6.

Dance troupe
In season 12, the show introduced the troupe, consisting of professional dancers who perform on the show but are not paired with celebrity partners. The first troupe in season 12 included Oksana Dmytrenko, Tristan MacManus, Peta Murgatroyd, Kiki Nyemchek, Nicole Volynets, and Ted Volynets. Other past troupe members include Artur Adamski, Brandon Armstrong, Lindsay Arnold, Alan Bersten, Sharna Burgess, Henry Byalikov, Witney Carson, Brittany Cherry, Dasha Chesnokova, Artem Chigvintsev, Hayley Erbert, Sasha Farber, Sofia Ghavami, Shannon Holtzapffel, Dennis Jauch, Jenna Johnson, Daniella Karagach, Kiril Kulish, Vladislav Kvartin, Morgan Larson, Keo Motsepe, Sonny Fredie-Pedersen, Gleb Savchenko, Emma Slater, Britt Stewart, and Julz Tocker.

The troupe was brought back for season 31 after not having one for three seasons. The troupe members included D'Angelo Castro, Kateryna Klishyna, Ezra Sosa, and Alexis Warr.

Key:
 Active member of the troupe
 Professional partner

Other professional dancers
In season 30, two professional dancers, Sofia Ghavami and Ezra Sosa, joined the cast. Both dancers are not paired with a celebrity partner, but are instead showcased as part of the competing couples' dances throughout the season. They are also prepared to step in if a pro is unable to compete.

Series overview

Scoring and voting procedure
In the first two seasons, only the overall ranking between competitors by the judges and the public was relevant. In the third season and all subsequent seasons, the scoring system has also made the exact scores relevant.

The scoring begins with the judges' marks. Each judge gives a numeric score from 1 to 10, for a total score of 3 to 30 or 40. The scoring was altered for the "all-star" season 15, during which judges could give scores at 1/2-point intervals from 0.5 to 10, for a total score of 1.5 to 30. When multiple performances are scored, only the cumulative total counts. The contestants' judges' shares are calculated as the percentage of the total number of points awarded to all contestants that evening. (For example, if a team earned 20 pts on a night when the judges awarded 200 pts, their judges' share would be 20/200 = 10%.) This percentage is then added to the percentage of North American votes received by each contestant. The two couples with the lowest scoring are identified at the end of the show, and the couple with the lowest combined total gets eliminated. Season 8 added an occasional 'dance-off', in which contestants could re-perform one of their dances, in an effort to improve their judges' score. This was later discontinued. The first perfect score of the season never occurred in the first or second week of the competition.

Public voting is conducted via a toll-free number, the ABC website, and, most recently, text messages and Facebook; contestants can vote during and immediately after each performance show. The maximum number of votes per voter per medium is equal to the number of couples performing that night, or five votes, whichever is larger. In April 2010, it was revealed that former contestant Kate Gosselin had e-mailed friends and family asking them to vote as many as 10 times each. In November 2010, The Washington Post reported that online voting appeared not to require a valid email address, and accordingly that numerous votes apparently could be cast by one person.

In several cases where ESPN coverage of Monday Night Football airs instead on an ABC affiliate in an NFL team's home market, the program is delayed to air immediately after that station's local news, Jimmy Kimmel Live, and Nightline, and a voting window confined only to the area codes of the pre-empted market is opened up to allow affected viewers to still put their votes in for the competition, though this is on a market-by-market basis (in some markets, an alternate sister station or digital subchannel carries the program live as scheduled).

Seasons 1 and 3 featured only two couples in the final week instead of three. Starting with season 16, four couples made it into the final week, although the top three finalists proceeded to dance one more time for the judges after the fourth-place couple was announced. In seasons 20, 22, 24, and 26 there were three couples in the final week, but in seasons 21, 23, 25, 27, 28, 29, 30 and 31 there were four.

Starting in season 28, the two couples with the lowest combined total of judges' scores and viewer voting percentages are at the bottom two and in jeopardy of being eliminated. In these seasons, the judges have the ability to save one of the bottom two couples from elimination. If three couples are in danger of elimination, the couple with the lowest combined total of judges' scores and viewer votes is eliminated and the other two couples will face judges' decision, who have to vote to save one couple from elimination.

Statistics

Highest-scoring celebrities
The scores presented below represent the best overall accumulative average scores the celebrities gained each series. Seasons having a maximum of 40 points (19, 20, 23, 24, 30 and 31) have been converted to a 30-point base. These averages do not reflect scores given by guest judges.

Female

Male

Winners

Best average by season

Lowest-scoring celebrities
The scores presented below represent the worst overall accumulative average score the celebrities gained each series.

Female

Male

Highest and lowest scoring performances by dance
The best and worst performances in each dance according to the judges' marks (out of 30) are as follows. Scores given by guest judges have not been included.

Latin

Ballroom

 * denotes score given during Switch Up Week, where celebrities are partnered with a different professional dancer.
Other Styles

Perfect scores 
This is a list of celebrities who earned perfect scores (team dances are not included).

1Shawn Johnson danced her Paso doble/Tango fusion dance with Mark Ballas instead of her partner Derek Hough due to him being injured.
2James Hinchcliffe danced his Viennese Waltz with Jenna Johnson instead of his partner Sharna Burgess due to her being injured.
3Nastia Liukin danced her Jive and Quickstep with Sasha Farber instead of her partner Derek Hough due to him being injured.
4For the switch-up week, Alexa PenaVega got a perfect score with Derek Hough instead of her original partner Mark Ballas.

Professionals with perfect scores

Professionals by number of Finals Appearances

Professionals by number of Wins

Couples who never scored below an 8 
This is a list of the couples who never received an individual score lower than 8 (excluding team dances).

^Mark Ballas has the most partners to achieve this feat with four, while Valentin Chmerkovskiy has three, and Cheryl Burke and Derek Hough each have two.

Highest First Week Scores 
This is a list of the couples who scored the highest in their first week. Scores out of 40 were adjusted to a 30-point scale.

Earliest Perfect Scores 
This is a list of the earliest perfect scores received throughout the season. Season 26 (Athletes) is excluded due to the shorter competition.

General information

Payment
On the April 18, 2006, episode of the Howard Stern Radio Show, Stern's wife Beth said that she was guaranteed to earn $125,000 for just appearing on DWTS (in season 3) and could earn up to more than double the original sum, depending on how long she lasted on the program.

In season 21, Bindi Irwin had her payments withheld by a Los Angeles County Superior Court judge because she was a minor, which therefore required her parents to sign-off on the contract. But although her mother signed, the contract lacked her father's signature, so the judge refused to validate the contract, despite Irwin's father being the world-famous naturalist Steve Irwin, whose death in 2006 had been widely covered in the news/media. The judge later validated the contract once Steve Irwin's death certificate was presented to the court, resulting in Bindi receiving a $350,000 paycheck from the show.

Withdrawals
The first person to withdraw from competition was Romeo in season 2. His father, Master P, took his place in the competition before the beginning of broadcasts, being partnered with Ashly DelGrosso. However, Romeo later competed in season 12 and finished in 5th place. He was partnered with Chelsie Hightower.

On week six in season three, Sara Evans cited her divorce as the reason for leaving the competition. No one was eliminated that week. Another withdrawal occurred during the run-up to season four on February 28, when Vincent Pastore withdrew from the competition after only one week of training. Pastore said he did not realize how much work was needed during a ten-week period, and that he was not up to the physical demands of the show. He was replaced on March 2 by Pixar voice actor John Ratzenberger who was partnered with Edyta Sliwinska.

In season seven, Misty May-Treanor withdrew from the competition in week three, after rupturing her Achilles tendon when rehearsing her jive with her partner, Maksim Chmerkovskiy. She did not perform the routine at all nor was she scored for it; no one else was eliminated that week.

In season eight, Jewel and Nancy O'Dell were injured before the season even began and could not compete. Jewel was diagnosed with fractured tibias in both legs; she came back later in the season to perform "Somewhere Over the Rainbow" on a results show. O'Dell suffered from a torn knee cartilage.  They were replaced by Holly Madison and Melissa Rycroft who would be dancing with their partners for the rest of the season (Dmitry Chaplin and Tony Dovolani).

Tom DeLay, in season nine, withdrew in week three of competition due to a full stress fracture that had developed in both feet from an earlier pre-stress fracture in one foot. DeLay was declared safe before he announced his withdrawal during the October 6, 2009, results show. Debi Mazar was still eliminated that night despite DeLay's departure.

In season sixteen, Olympic figure skating champion Dorothy Hamill had to withdraw from the competition due to doctor's orders for a spinal injury. A cyst had developed near her lower spine, and was pinching off the nerve in that area. Either boxing champion Victor Ortiz or reality TV star Lisa Vanderpump would have been eliminated, but Hamill withdrew before the results could be announced, meaning that no one was eliminated that week.

In season eighteen, week three, actor Billy Dee Williams withdrew, by advice from a doctor, due to a chronic back problem (which resulted in no elimination that week).

In season twenty-one, week three, reality TV star Kim Zolciak-Biermann was forced to withdraw from the competition after suffering a blood clot which resulted in a mini stroke (which resulted in no elimination that week). Tamar Braxton also withdrew from the season due to blood clots in her lungs making it the first season to have two withdrawals in it.

In season twenty eight, Christie Brinkley withdrew from the competition a week before the season premiere, due to injuring her arm during rehearsal and needing sudden surgery. She was replaced by her daughter, Sailor with only a few days to practice prior to the season premiere. Later that season, Ray Lewis withdrew from the competition in the third week due to a toe injury he sustained during rehearsal that needed surgery. This is the second season to have two withdrawals.

In Season 29 during the 8th week, television host Jeannie Mai withdrew from the show after being hospitalized for epiglottitis. As a result, the double elimination that was supposed to happen did not take place. Only one couple, Chrishell Stause and Gleb Savchenko, were eliminated that night.

In Season 31 during the 5th week, movie star Selma Blair withdrew from the show to prevent her health with MS from getting more deteriorated. This marks the first time where a celebrity got the first perfect score of the season and withdrew on the same episode. As a result, there were no elimination that first night of the 5th week.

Macy's Stars of Dance: Design a Dance
Beginning in season 7, viewers had the opportunity to vote for their favorite professional dancers (or in some cases former contestants) to perform a particular style of dance to a song, also of their choice. An online contest is also usually held so that viewers can submit drawings of outfits for the performance.

Special episodes

100th episode
The show celebrated its 100th episode on Tuesday, May 6, 2008, during week 8 of season 6. More than 30 former cast members and pros returned, with interviews with Stacy Keibler, Lisa Rinna, Jerry Springer, Vivica A. Fox, Joey Fatone, Kenny Mayne, Sabrina Bryan, and former winners Kelly Monaco, Drew Lachey, and Apolo Anton Ohno. Other appearances, besides the season 6 cast, included Paula Abdul (in a video introduction), Jane Seymour, Ian Ziering, Mark Cuban, Wayne Newton, Leeza Gibbons, Harry Hamlin, Shandi Finnessey, and Hélio Castroneves. New routines were performed by Apolo Anton Ohno and Julianne Hough, Mel B and Maksim Chmerkovskiy, and by Mario Lopez with the cast of A Chorus Line, in which he was starring on Broadway. The musical guest was country group Rascal Flatts.

Judges' top 10 dances
The judges also presented a countdown of their choices for the top 10 perfect-scoring dances of the 1st 5 seasons. Their choices were:

200th episode
In season 11, viewers were allowed two votes per day on the DWTS website to vote for their favorite out of 30 given choices. On October 25, 2010, a countdown of the Top 10 voted for dances on the show was reported to celebrate the following week when the 200th show would be.

On the actual 200th show, several dances were performed again on the show and six of the past fan favorites came back to judge; Helio Castroneves, Emmitt Smith, Drew Lachey, Kelly Osbourne, Gilles Marini, Mel B, and more. The couples re-created their most memorable routines on the 200th episode; Kristi Yamaguchi and Apolo Ohno served as team captains for the team dances. Yamaguchi's team consisted of Rick & Cheryl, Kyle & Lacey and Bristol & Mark, while Brandy & Maksim, Jennifer & Derek and Kurt & Anna were on Ohno's team. On the results show of November 2, some awards were given out to past celebrity contestants and professionals.

300th episode
The 300th episode took place on the week 9 results show of season 16. Twenty-two professional dancers who had appeared on the show, both past and present, performed an opening number choreographed by Jason Gilkinson. Past pros who performed were Chelsie Hightower, Dmitry Chaplin, Louis Van Amstel, and Anna Trebunskaya. Kellie Pickler and Derek Hough danced their "Argentine tango" as the week's encore. However, the top 10 dances were not revealed, nor were the achievements.

400th episode
The 400th episode was the season premiere of the twenty-fourth season. Tom Bergeron did mention the milestone, although no special dances took place.

10th Anniversary Special
On April 28, 2015, during season 20, a special pre-recorded episode aired as a 10th anniversary special with many former stars and professional dancers returning to the ballroom. Many past stars performed and reflected on their time on the show. Patti LaBelle, Amber Riley, and Lil' Kim performed LaBelle's "Lady Marmalade". The show closed with the largest number of people dancing in the show's history as stars, pros, hosts, and judges were all out on the dance floor.

Dancing With the Stars: The Pros' Most Memorable Dances 
Brandon Armstrong, Cheryl Burke, Kym Herjavec, and Derek Hough hosted the Dancing With the Stars: The Pros' Most Memorable Dances where they showed the 20 most memorable dances in the history of the show's thirty seasons. It premiered on Disney+ on September 8, 2022.

Tributes
In seasons 9 and 10, three tribute performances were done to honor the memory of artists and others. The first was a tribute to recently deceased actor Patrick Swayze, on September 23, 2009. "She's Like the Wind" from the Dirty Dancing soundtrack (originally written by Swayze for Dirty Dancing), "Unchained Melody" from his film Ghost, and "(I've Had) The Time of my Life" from Dirty Dancing were performed by select professional dancers of the show.

On October 20, 2009, a tribute was done for singer and dancer, Michael Jackson. "I Want You Back", "Man in the Mirror", and "Thriller" were performed—the first two songs by select professional dancers of the show, with all coming together for "Thriller".

In season 10, professional Haitian dancers performed as a tribute to victims of the 2010 Haiti earthquake on March 30, 2010. One of the male dancers, Emmanuel Pierre-Antoine, had lost his son in the rubble. They were dancing to "Dance Like This" by Wyclef Jean.

In season 24, to honor the passing of season 11 contestant Florence Henderson on November 24, 2016, a special tribute to Henderson was displayed on the dance floor. The season 24 premiere aired on March 20, 2017.

In season 28, at the end of the premiere episode, a tribute was placed on the dance floor to honor the passing of actress and season 17 contestant Valerie Harper who died on August 30, 2019. Her star was placed right next to Florence Henderson's.

In season 30, at the end of the premiere episode, two tributes were placed on the dance floor to honor the passings of season 7 contestant Cloris Leachman and season 28 contestant Mary Wilson.

In season 31, the eighth episode was dedicated in memory of season 9 contestant Aaron Carter who passed away two days prior.

Merchandise, tours, and spin-offs

Cardio dance DVDs
A DVD titled Dancing With The Stars: Cardio Dance was released on April 3, 2007, featuring Kym Johnson, Maksim Chmerkovskiy and Ashly DelGrosso. The program contains cardiovascular workouts adapted from cha-cha, Paso doble, samba, and jive dance routines.

A second DVD Dancing with the Stars: Latin Cardio Dance was released on September 13, 2008, featuring Maksim Chmerkovskiy and Cheryl Burke. The program contains cardiovascular workouts adapted from cha-cha, Merengue, samba and mambo dance routines.

Companion book
A companion book written by Guy Phillips was released in the early fall of 2007. Titled Dancing with the Stars: Jive, Samba and Tango Your Way Into The Best Shape Of Your Life, the book includes fitness routines modeled by Alec Mazo and Edyta Sliwinska, as well as original costume designs, lists of performed songs during a dance, and a complete list of song-and-dance routine performed since the first season of the show.

Spin-offs
The first Dancing spin-off, Dance War: Bruno vs. Carrie Ann, premiered on January 7, 2008, on ABC.  The show's format was similar to the BBC Television series, DanceX. The show was canceled after one season.

A figure skating spin-off similar to ITV's Dancing on Ice called Skating with the Stars aired on ABC on November 22, 2010. The series was canceled after one season.

On May 16, 2017, a Dancing with the Stars: Juniors spin-off was announced. The dance competition spin-off was originally set to premiere in the spring of 2018 on ABC, and the format of the show will feature celebrity children and the children of celebrities paired with professional junior ballroom dancers. In January 2018, ABC stated that Dancing with the Stars: Juniors is still in the works, but didn't develop as quickly they hoped it would. Athletes aired in its place, with Juniors originally slated to air that summer. However, In May 2018, it was announced that the series would begin airing on October 7, 2018, with filming taking place during August 2018. Professional skateboarder Sky Brown, junior pro JT Church and pro mentor Alan Bersten were announced as the winners on December 9, 2018. The show was canceled after one season.

Dancing with the Stars: The Game
In 2016, ABC, together with BBC Worldwide, commissioned a companion mobile game. The match-3 game, published by Donut Publishing and developed by Exient Entertainment, uses a mix of hand animation and motion-captured data for the dances in the game. The game uses pro dancers from Strictly Come Dancing and features nine dances: Quickstep, Jive, Tango, Salsa, Charleston, Viennese Waltz, Rumba, Cha Cha Cha, and Paso Doble.

Tours
An unofficial live tour show called Dancing Pros: Live! toured with several Dancing pros since 2010. A Dancing with the Stars: Live! official tour was announced on November 3, 2014, for the 2014–2015 season starting on December 27, 2014, in Niagara Falls, New York, and ending February 15, 2015, hitting 33 cities. A second tour, "Dancing with the Stars Live! : Dance All Night" was announced. A third tour, Dancing with the Stars: Live! – We Came to Dance, was announced on October 3, 2016, for 43 cities from December 16, 2016, to February 14, 2017. A fourth tour, Dancing with the Stars: Light Up the Night, was announced in October 2017 and began on December 30, 2017, in Charlotte, North Carolina, performing 71 shows and ending in Los Angeles. A fifth tour, Dancing with the Stars: A Night to Remember, was announced on October 1, 2018. The tour began on December 15, 2018, in Columbia, South Carolina, and ended on March 9, 2019, in Thousand Oaks, California. The 2020 tour, Dancing with the Stars Live! – 2020 Tour, began on January 9, 2020, in Richmond, Virginia and was originally supposed to run until April 7, 2020. However, beginning with the show scheduled for March 13, 2020, in Rockford, Illinois, the remaining tour dates were postponed due to the COVID-19 pandemic before eventually being cancelled altogether. The 2022 tour, Dancing with the Stars Live! – 2022 Tour, began on January 7, 2022, in Richmond, Virginia, and ended on March 27, 2022, in Modesto, California. The 2023 tour, Dancing with the Stars Live 2023, began on January 6, 2023, in National Harbor, Maryland, and end on March 12, 2023, in Las Vegas, Nevada.

Reception
In 2016, a New York Times study of the 50 TV shows with the most Facebook Likes found that "unlike So You Think You Can Dance, which is generally more of a city show, Dancing with the Stars is most popular in the countryside. It also has a higher share of 'likes' from viewers aged 65 and up than any other show."

U.S. Nielsen ratings

Awards and nominations

Emmy Awards

The program has also been nominated for various other production-related awards since premiering in 2005, including for hairstyling, makeup, lighting design, and technical direction.

Others

See also
 Strictly Come Dancing, the original British version of the program
 Dancing with the Stars, which contains a full list of international versions

References

External links
 
 
 
 Dancing with the Stars at TV by the Numbers

 
2000s American reality television series
2005 American television series debuts
2010s American reality television series
2020s American reality television series
American Broadcasting Company original programming
American television series based on British television series
Ballroom dance
Dance competition television shows
Disney+ original programming
English-language television shows
Primetime Emmy Award-winning television series
Television series by BBC Studios